
Gmina Ujście is an urban-rural gmina (administrative district) in Piła County, Greater Poland Voivodeship, in west-central Poland.

Villages
Apart from the town of Ujście, Gmina Ujście contains the villages and settlements of Bronisławki, Byszki, Chrustowo, Jabłonowo, Kruszewo, Ługi Ujskie, Mirosław, Nowa Wieś Ujska, Nowie, Śluza Nowe, Ujście-Łęg, Węglewo and Wilanowiec.

Neighbouring gminas
Gmina Ujście is bordered by the town of Piła and by the gminas of Chodzież, Czarnków, Kaczory and Trzcianka.

References
Polish official population figures 2006

Ujscie
Piła County